Comamonas serinivorans is a Gram-negative, rod-shaped and non-spore-forming bacterium from the genus Comamonas which has been isolated from wheat straw compost from the Zhuwan farm, Yuncheng County, Shandong Province, China.

References

External links
Type strain of Comamonas serinivorans at BacDive -  the Bacterial Diversity Metadatabase

Comamonadaceae
Bacteria described in 2014